Joe Barnett Cannon (born January 29, 1935) is an American politician. He served as a Democratic member in the Texas House of Representatives from 1959 to 1964.

References

External links
 

1935 births
Living people
Members of the Texas House of Representatives